The FIBT World Championships 1977 took place in St. Moritz, Switzerland for the record thirteenth time. The Swiss city had hosted the event previously in 1931 (Four-man), 1935 (Four-man), 1937 (Four-man), 1938 (Two-man), 1939 (Two-man), 1947, 1955, 1957, 1959, 1965, 1970, and 1974.

Two man bobsleigh

Four man bobsleigh
 

The East Germans earned their first medal at this championship.

Medal table

References
2-Man bobsleigh World Champions
4-Man bobsleigh World Champions

IBSF World Championships
Sport in St. Moritz
1977 in bobsleigh
International sports competitions hosted by Switzerland
Bobsleigh in Switzerland 
1977 in Swiss sport